Edinaldo may refer to:

 Edinaldo (given name)
 Edinaldo (footballer, born 1987), Edinaldo Batista dos Santos, Brazilian football forward
 Edinaldo (footballer, born 1988), Edinaldo Malcher de França Filho, Brazilian football defender